Krupal Balaji Tumane is an Indian politician from Nagpur who is re-elected in 17th Lok Sabha  & was member of the 16th Lok Sabha of India. He represented the Ramtek constituency of Nagpur district, Maharashtra and is a member of the Shiv Sena political party. He defeated sitting MP and former Cabinet Minister Mukul Wasnik of Indian National Congress Party.

Positions held
 2019: Re-Elected to 17th Lok Sabha
 2014: Elected to 16th Lok Sabha
 14 Aug. 2014 onwards 	Member, Committee on Welfare of Scheduled Castes and Scheduled Tribes
 1 Sep. 2014 onwards 	Member, Standing Committee on Coal and Steel
 3 Sep. 2014 onwards 	Member, Consultative Committee, Ministry of Petroleum and Natural Gas

References

External links
 Shivsena Home Page
 http://164.100.47.132/LssNew/Members/Biography.aspx?mpsno=4734

Living people
1966 births
People from Nagpur district
Shiv Sena politicians
Lok Sabha members from Maharashtra
India MPs 2014–2019
Marathi politicians
India MPs 2019–present